Goran Meštrović (born June 13, 1966) is a Croatian retired footballer who played as a midfielder and also served as a football manager.

Playing career 
Meštrović played in the National Soccer League in 1990 with Toronto Croatia. In 1992, he played in the Croatian First Football League with HNK Cibalia. In 1996, he played with NK Osijek, and returned to Cibalia the following season. He featured in the 1999 Croatian Football Cup final against NK Osijek. On June 17, 2001, he announced his retirement from professional football.

Managerial career  
Meštrović served as an assistant coach under Davor Mladina for former club HNK Cibalia in 2005. He served as a head coach for Cibalia for one match in 2006. In 2015, he was named the head coach for HNK Vukovar '91 in the Croatian Third Football League. On November 17, 2017, he was named the head coach for Cibalia's football academy.

References  

1966 births
Living people
Association football midfielders
Yugoslav footballers
Croatian footballers
Toronto Croatia players
HNK Cibalia players
NK Osijek players
Canadian National Soccer League players
Croatian Football League players
Yugoslav expatriate footballers
Expatriate soccer players in Canada
Yugoslav expatriate sportspeople in Canada
Croatian football managers
HNK Cibalia managers
Croatian Football League managers